General Juan Facundo Quiroga is a department of La Rioja Province in Argentina.

Settlements 
Atiles
Illisca
La Aguadita
Malanzán
Nácate
Portezuelo
San Antonio
San Ramón
San Roque

References 

Departments of La Rioja Province, Argentina